The 2013 Motor City Open is an International 70 tournament of the PSA World Tour. The event took place at the Birmingham Athletic Club in Detroit in the United States from 26 January to 29 January 2013. Amr Shabana won his first Motor City Open title, beating Karim Darwish in the final.

Prize money and ranking points
For 2013, the prize purse was $70,000. The prize money and points breakdown is as follows:

Seeds

Draw and results

See also
PSA World Tour 2013
Motor City Open (squash)

References

External links
PSA Motor City Open 2013 website 
Motor City Open 2013 official website

Motor City Open (squash)
2013 in American sports
2013 in sports in Michigan
2013 in squash